The Regret Stakes is a Grade III American Thoroughbred horse race for three-year-old fillies  over a distance of one and one-eighth miles (9 furlongs) on the Turf scheduled annually in mid-June near the end of the Spring Meet at Churchill Downs in Louisville, Kentucky. The event offers a purse of $200,000.

History
The race is named for Harry Payne Whitney's champion filly Regret, the first filly to win the 1915 Kentucky Derby. In the Blood-Horse magazine ranking of the top 100 U.S. thoroughbred champions of the 20th Century, she is #71 and in a poll among members of the American Trainers Association, she was voted the third greatest filly in American racing history. Regret was undefeated as a two-year-old, she made her three-year-old debut in the Derby, winning in wire-to-wire fashion. 

The race was inaugural running on 16 May 1970 and was run over a distance of 6 furlongs and won by Tree Pigeons ridden by veteran jockey Tommy Barrows in a fast time of 1:10. The Regret Stakes was run at six furlongs for its first twelve runnings (1970–1981).  From 1982 to 1987 the race was run at a distance of one mile and from 1988 to 2002 it was run at  miles. From 2003 to present it has been run at its current distance of  miles. 

The event was classified a Grade III event for the first time in 1999. 

The event has been run in division four times - in 1974, 1976, 1980 and 1982.

Records
Speed record:  
  miles – 1:47.31 - Lady of Venice (2006)
  miles – 1:42.14 - Packet (1994)

Margins: 
 7 lengths – Amazing Love  (1982) 
 7 lengths – Red Cross  (1975) 

Most wins by a jockey
 4 - Julien Leparoux (2006, 2008, 2015, 2022)

Most wins by a trainer
 4 - William I. Mott (1984, 1986, 1991, 2020)

Most wins by an owner
 2 - Leslie Combs II (1971, 1977)
 2 - Golden Chance Farm (1974, 1976)
 2 - Hiram Polk, Jr. (1984, 1991)

Winners

Legend:

 
 

Notes:

† In 1977, Time for Pleasure won but was disqualified after laying in the stretch and was placed second. 

‡ In 2014, A Little Bit Sassy won but was disqualified for interfering with Kiss Moon and was placed fourth. Aurelia's Belle who finished second was declared the winner.

§ Ran as part of an entry

See also
 List of American and Canadian Graded races

References

Graded stakes races in the United States
Flat horse races for three-year-old fillies
Churchill Downs horse races
Recurring sporting events established in 1970
1970 establishments in Kentucky
Grade 3 stakes races in the United States
Turf races in the United States